Tørla is a small island in Ålesund Municipality in Møre og Romsdal county, Norway. It has bridge connections to the islands of Humla (to the west) and to Uksenøya (to the east).  The island is located in the inner part of the Borgundfjorden, south of the village of Spjelkavik and just north of the island of Sula.

The island was part of Borgund Municipality until 1968, when Borgund was merged into Ålesund Municipality.  Grendahuset is a former school that is now a community hall that is situated in the middle part of the island.  Most of the development is on the western part of the island, while the eastern part is mostly wooded.

See also
List of islands of Norway

References

Ålesund
Islands of Møre og Romsdal